Ramiro Ruiz Medrano (born 3 June 1958) is a Spanish politician of the People's Party of Castile and León. He was a member of the Congress of Deputies from 1989 to 1993, and the  Government Delegate in Castile and León, in office from 16 January 2012 to 10 April 2015. He was president of the provincial deputation of Valladolid from 1993 to 2011. He became the president of the Valladolid People's Party in 2009.

Biography
Ramiro Ruiz was born in Renedo de Esgueva, Spain. He earned a Master of Arts from the University of Valladolid, and was professor of general basic educatio (EGB). Ramiro Ruiz was mayor of Renedo de Esgueva from 1983 to 1999. Ramiro Ruiz was elected senator in the fifth legislature and deputy in the fourth legislature. He was a deputy and first vice-president of the Cortes of Castile and León from 2015 to 2019.

References 

1958 births
Living people
20th-century Spanish politicians
21st-century Spanish politicians
People's Party (Spain) politicians
Members of the 8th Cortes of Castile and León
Members of the 9th Cortes of Castile and León
Members of the 10th Cortes of Castile and León
Members of the 11th Cortes of Castile and León